The Colby–Bates–Bowdoin Chase Regatta (often abbreviated CBB Chase or the "Chase Regatta") is an annual rowing regatta between the men's and women's heavyweight varsity and club rowing crews of Colby, Bates, and Bowdoin College. The colleges have competed in the regatta since August 3, 1988 but have competed annually since August 3, 1997, when Bates President Thomas Hedley Reynolds instated the President's Cup to be contested by all three of the CBB schools. The President's Cup is given to the team that has won the most overall heats and races, while the overall winner is determined by who won the most varsity and heavyweight competitions in the regatta.

All three of the schools compete against each other in the Colby-Bates-Bowdoin Consortium (CBBC) and the New England Small College Athletic Conference (NESCAC). The consortium also features an academic exchange and other sports, most notably American football. Rowing is the most active boat sport of Bates and Colby, with Bowdoin being more active in Sailing. Bowdoin is the only college in the CBB to maintain a Club Rowing team, and suspended its varsity team at its founding.

The all-time leader of the Chase Regatta is Bates with a total of 18 composite wins, followed by Colby's 5 wins, concluding with Bowdoin's 1 win. The regatta has been held on various waters, and is hosted by all three of the colleges; the most frequent waters occupied are: the Androscoggin River (Bates and Bowdoin), the Kennebec River (Colby), and Messalonskee River (Colby).

Regatta results

Overall winner and President's Cup 
Results from the Colby-Bates-Bowdoin Chase Regatta (President's Cup: 1997-2022).

Note: The President's Cup is given to the team that has won the most overall heats and races, while the overall winner is determined by who won the most varsity and heavyweight competitions in the regatta.

Records 
 Number of wins: (Bates) — 18 composite wins
 Most consecutive victories: (Bates, 2006-2022 — overall winner), (Bates, 2011-2022 — President's Cup winner)
 Smallest winning margin: (Bowdoin, 1997) — .9-second margin over Colby
 Largest winning margin: (Bates, 2013) — 59-second margin ahead of runner-up Colby.

Trophies 
The President's Cup — Bates President Thomas Hedley Reynolds instated the Presidents' Cup to be contested by all three of the CBB schools.

The Clayton — An unofficial contention between Bowdoin and Bates with their club and varsity races; named after their respective presidents' first names.

See also 
 List of college athletic programs in Maine

References 

College sports rivalries in the United States
College rowing competitions in the United States
Bates College
Bates Bobcats
Colby Mules
Colby College
Bowdoin College
Bowdoin Polar Bears